Caterina Ganz (born 13 November 1995) is an Italian cross-country skier who competes internationally.

She competed for Italy at the FIS Nordic World Ski Championships 2017 in Lahti, Finland.

Cross-country skiing results
All results are sourced from the International Ski Federation (FIS).

Olympic Games

World Championships

World Cup

Season standings

References

External links 
 

1995 births
Living people
Italian female cross-country skiers
Tour de Ski skiers
Olympic cross-country skiers of Italy
Cross-country skiers at the 2022 Winter Olympics